The Sitara Arm Processor family, developed by Texas Instruments, features ARM9, ARM Cortex-A8, ARM Cortex-A9, ARM Cortex-A15, and ARM Cortex-A53 application cores, C66x DSP cores, imaging and multimedia acceleration cores, industrial communication IP, and other technology to serve a broad base of applications.  Development using Sitara Processors is supported by the open source Beagle community as well as Texas Instruments' open source development community.

Products featuring Sitara Arm 
 Nest, a learning thermostat
 Netgate SG-1000, a micro firewall based on pfSense
 MOD/MOD Live, makes GPS-enabled Micro Optics Displays (MOD) for snow goggles
 BeagleBone Black single board computer
 BeagleBoard-X15 single board computer
 Lego Mindstorms EV3 - Lego Mindstorms EV3 bricks use the ARM9 TI Sitara AM1x

The Sitara family 
Sitara Arm Processors available today include:

See also 
 TI OMAP (Open Multimedia Applications Platform) SoC family

References

External links 
 Sitara Processors
 AM1705 Linux
 Ittiam Press Release on Clove: Ittiam Systems Announces Low-Power Industrial System Solutions based on the new Sitara AM57x processors from Texas Instruments

ARM-based systems on chips
Texas Instruments microprocessors
Embedded microprocessors